Evan William Thornley (born 1964), is an Australian entrepreneur. Thornley was founding chair of Per Capita and National Secretary of the Australian Fabian Society. He was a board member of the Brotherhood of St Laurence and the Chifley Research Centre, was a founding director of GetUp!. Along with his wife, he founded LookSmart, the first Australian dot-com company listed on the NASDAQ. During the dot-com bubble, his stake in the company was worth almost $1 billion, but its value declined by 99% as the bubble burst. He is also a co-founder of the Goodstart Consortium - a social enterprise that owns the largest childcare network in the world (formerly called ABC Learning). He was formerly the CEO of Better Place Australia and Global CEO of Better Place LLC, a now-defunct company which intended to supply electric cars and the charging or switching stations to support them. Thornely has recently started a property management company to better serve the Australian Property Market named LongView.

Thornley served in public office for two years as the Labor member of the Victorian Legislative Council for the Southern Metropolitan Region, and as Parliamentary Secretary to Premiers Bracks and Brumby.

Background and early career
Thornley attended Scotch College, Melbourne and is a graduate of the University of Melbourne. He commenced his university studies in 1983 and served in full-time elected student office as President of the Student Representative Council, and then in the National Union of Students in 1987 and 1988. He completed a Bachelor of Commerce and a Bachelor of Laws degree in 1990, and from 1991 to 1995 he was a consultant at McKinsey and Company, a management consultancy firm.

Political career 
Elected to the Parliament of Victoria in 2006, he served as Parliamentary Secretary assisting the Premier on the National Reform Agenda and Innovation until his resignation on 31 December 2008. He is a noted donor to various progressive causes, including the Australian Labor Party.

On 28 December 2008, Thornley announced that he would resign from the Victorian Parliament, despite speculation that he would be chosen to serve as a minister in John Brumby's government. His resignation was received angrily by some Labor colleagues who thought his decision "insulting" and a "disgrace." He had been appointed as the CEO of Australian operations for Better Place, a company promoting electric cars.

A joint sitting of the Legislative Assembly and the Legislative Council of the Victorian Parliament was required to select a new member to fill the vacancy caused by Thornley's resignation. It was the first casual vacancy to occur since the reform of the Legislative Council in 2006. Under the new rules, which mirror those of the Australian Senate, if the vacating MLC had been elected as a member of a political party, the joint sitting must select a person nominated by that political party. On 30 January 2009, it was announced that Melbourne lawyer Jennifer Huppert had been nominated by the ALP to fill the upper house vacancy.

Post-political career 
Having served as the Australian head of Better Place since his resignation from parliament, Thornley was elevated to global CEO of the company following the sacking, in October 2012, of its founder and major spokesperson Shai Agassi. However, Thornley severed his connection with Better Place only three months later.

In January 2014, he became executive chair of Same Business Different Outcome (SBDO), a private equity firm. He is now executive chair of LongView, a property management company.

Connection to Israel, Judaism 
Thornley first went to Israel on a Young Political Leaders' Tour while at University and was part of a pro-Israel group humorously dubbed "the Mossad faction". He led an Australia Israel Chamber of Commerce trade mission to Israel in 2008 and has been a delegate to the Australia Israel Leadership Forum several times. He was Secretary of the Parliamentary Friends of Israel and visited Israel over 30 times during his tenure at Better Place. He was a member of the strategic review panel for the Rabbinical Council of Victoria. Thornley began a formal process of converting to Judaism in 2012 under Rabbi Adam Stein at Kehilat Nitzan, Melbourne's only Conservative synagogue. Thornley formally completed the conversion process on 19 August 2014 and adopted the Hebrew name of "Lev Yonatan".

References

External links 
 
 Scotch College profile

1965 births
Australian Labor Party members of the Parliament of Victoria
Businesspeople from Melbourne
Living people
McKinsey & Company people
Members of the Victorian Legislative Council
People educated at Scotch College, Melbourne
Politicians from Melbourne
Melbourne Law School alumni
21st-century Australian politicians
Converts to Judaism
Australian Jews